The White's Chair of Moral Philosophy was endowed in 1621 by Thomas White (c. 1550–1624), Canon of Christ Church as the oldest professorial post in philosophy at the University of Oxford.

In 2021, the chair was renamed the Sekyra and White’s Professorship of Moral Philosophy following a gift from the Sekyra Foundation.

Under the original agreement, the professorship was to receive a stipend of £100 per annum, along with other payments and emoluments. The chair was not to be held for more than five years, or at the most ten years.  In 1673, a practice began of electing one of the proctors, usually the senior, to the office; in course of time the lectures were entirely dropped; and at length the Professorship was so far forgotten, that it was never mentioned in the Oxford Calendar before the year 1831, the practice having continued, with one exception, until February 1829.

The professorship was established on a new footing by a statute approved by the Queen in Council in 1858. As a result of statutes made by the Commissioners of 1877, the professorship is now attached with a fellowship with Corpus Christi College.

The Sekyra and White’s Professor of Moral Philosophy leads the study and development of moral philosophy within Oxford and supervises doctoral and Master’s students in the subject. The postholder also chairs the Oxford Moral Philosophy Seminar, which has hosted the world’s leading moral philosophers in recent decades. Previous holders of the Chair have contributed to debates around the biggest challenges facing humanity.

Holders of the White's Professorship of Moral Philosophy
1621           William Price, MA, Student of Christ Church
1630		Thomas Ballow, MA, Student of Christ Church
1634		Edward Fulham, MA, Student of Christ Church
1638		George Gisbey, MA, Fellow of St. John’s College
1643		John Berkenhead, MA, Fellow of All Souls College
1648		Edward Copley, MA, Fellow of Merton College
1649		Henry Wilkinson, BD, Principal of Magdalen Hall
1654		Francis Howell, MA, Fellow of Exeter College; afterwards Principal of Jesus College
1657		William Carpender, MA, Student of Christ Church
1660		Francis Palmer, MA, Student of Christ Church
1664		Andrew Crispe, MA, Fellow of Christ Church
1668		Nathaniel Hodges, MA, Student of Christ Church
1673		Abraham Campion, MA, Fellow and Senior Proctor of Trinity College
...
1708		Edward Thwaytes, MA, Fellow of The Queen's College; Regius Professor of Greek
...
1829		William Mills, BD, Fellow of Magdalen College
1834		Renn Dickson Hampden, DD, Principal of St. Mary Hall; afterwards Regius Professor of Divinity, Bishop of Hereford
1836		William Sewell, MA, Fellow of Exeter College
1841		Charles William Stocker, DD, sometimes Fellow of St. John’s College
1842		George Henry Sacheverell Johnson, MA, Fellow of The Queen's College, Savilian Professor of Astronomy
1845		Henry George Liddell, MA, Student, afterwards Dean, of Christ Church
1846		John Matthias Wilson, MA, Fellow, afterwards President, of Corpus Christi College
1851		John Matthias Wilson, re-elected
1856–1858	Vacant
1858		John Matthias Wilson, re-elected
1874		John Richard Turner Eaton (1825–?), MA, sometimes Fellow of Merton College
1878		Thomas Hill (T.H.) Green (1836–1882), MA, Fellow of Balliol College
1882		William Wallace (1843–1897), MA, Student of Balliol College; Fellow of Merton College	
1897		John Alexander Stewart (1846–1933), MA, Student of Christ Church
1923		William David (W. D.) Ross (1877–1971), MA, Fellow of Oriel College
1928           Harold Arthur (H. A.) Prichard  (1871–1947), MA, Scholar at New College; Fellow at Hertford College, Trinity College, and Corpus Christi College
1937		Herbert James Paton (1887–1969), MA (Glasgow), MA, Snell Exhibitioner at Balliol College; Fellow of Corpus Christi College
1952		John Langshaw (J. L.) Austin (1911–1960), MA, Fellow of All Souls College and Magdalen College
1960		William Calvert Kneale	 (1906–1990), MA, Fellow of Exeter College	
1966		Richard Mervyn (R. M.) Hare (1919–2002), MA, Student and Fellow of Balliol College; Fellow of Corpus Christi College
1983–90	Vacant
1990		Bernard Arthur Owen Williams (1929–2003), MA, Fellow of Corpus Christi College
1996		James Griffin (1933–2019), BA (Yale), MA, DPhil, Fellow of Keble College and Corpus Christi College
2001		John Broome (1947–), BA (Cambridge), PhD (MIT), Fellow of Corpus Christi College
2014               Jeff McMahan (1954–), BA (Sewanee: University of the South), BA, MA (Oxford), PhD (Cambridge), Fellow of Corpus Christi College

See also
Wilde Professor of Mental Philosophy
Waynflete Professor of Metaphysical Philosophy
Wykeham Professor of Logic

References
Oxford University Archives,  The Historical Register of the University of Oxford , 1220–1900

Notes

Professorships at the University of Oxford
Professorships in philosophy
1621 establishments in England
Corpus Christi College, Oxford
Lists of people associated with the University of Oxford
Statutory Professors of the University of Oxford